Maine Central Railroad Class W locomotives were intended for heavy freight service.  They were of 2-8-0 wheel arrangement in the Whyte notation, or "1'D" in UIC classification. They replaced earlier class O 4-6-0 locomotives beginning in 1910. They were in turn replaced by class S 2-8-2 locomotives for the heaviest freight service beginning in 1914, but remained in use on lighter freight trains until replaced by diesel locomotives after World War II.

Sub-classes
All were built in American Locomotive Company's plant at Schenectady, New York. The first nine built in 1910 (builders numbers 47732-47736 & 49207-49210) were  lighter than the infobox figure. Sub-class W-1 consisted of seven locomotives added in 1912 (builders numbers 50933-50939) and eight more (builders numbers 52989-52996) delivered in 1913. The last four designated sub-class W-2 (builders numbers 54564-54567) were delivered in 1914 and were  heavier than the infobox figure.

Preservation
Class W locomotives were numbered from 501 to 528 as delivered. Numbers 501 and 519 were officially property of the European and North American Railway (E&NA) as a condition of the lease of that company by the Maine Central Railroad.  They therefore avoided scrapping until Maine Central purchased E&NA to remove the lease obligation in 1955. Two locomotives survived; No. 501 is currently under restoration to operating condition at the Conway Scenic Railroad and No. 519 was on display outside at the Steamtown National Historic Site, exposed to the elements.

Replacement
When the Maine Central began purchasing diesel locomotives, road switchers were numbered in the 500 series previously reserved for the W class. ALCO RS-2s and ALCO RS-3s were numbered 551 through 557, and EMD GP7s were numbered 561 through 569 and 571 through 581.

References 

Steam locomotives of the United States
2-8-0 locomotives
ALCO locomotives
W 2-8-0
Railway locomotives introduced in 1910
Freight locomotives
Standard gauge locomotives of the United States